Joseph Marie Audin-Rouvière (born 26 March 1764 in Carpentras; died in Paris on 23 April 1832) was a French doctor.

Biography 
He published in 1794 "Medicine without the doctor or health manual, a work intended to relieve infirmities, to prevent acute illnesses, to cure chronic illnesses, without the help of a foreign hand ", a work which became popular and obtained a large number of editions. He also amassed a great fortune by selling, under the name of grains of life or grains of health, a secret remedy which he gave as a universal remedy and which is only Johann Peter Frank's tonic- purgative. He was a member of the Masonic lodge "Les Frères Artistes" of the Sacred Order of the Sophisians.

Notes 

 Secret society dedicated to Isis, created in the Parisian lodge of the Artist Brothers by former members of the Egyptian expedition

References 

1764 births
People from Carpentras
1832 deaths
French physicians
17th-century French physicians